The Hyatt Regency Vancouver, located at 655 Burrard Street, is a 644-room hotel connected to the Royal Centre complex in Vancouver, British Columbia, Canada. Today, it is the 27th tallest building in downtown Vancouver.

Building
Built in 1973, the Hyatt Regency Vancouver is a 35 floor tower standing at 359 feet or 109 metres. It was Vancouver's tallest hotel from 1973 to 2001. It has the largest number of hotel rooms in one building.

1998 'Riot at the Hyatt'
In the week preceding this event posters were put up around town inviting people to a 'Riot at the Hyatt'. At the event crowds surrounded the hotel where Prime Minister Jean Chrétien was speaking. Vancouver Police Department waded into the crowd of demonstrators and, according to critics, "beat them with wooden nightsticks". Several young people were injured. The Vancouver Police Department investigated the matter for over a year and eventually issued a report concluding that the victims’ complaints of excessive force were unsubstantiated.

Gingerbread man
In 2003, the staff of the Hyatt Regency Vancouver property created the world's largest Gingerbread Man.

See also
List of tallest buildings in Vancouver

References

External links
Hyatt Regency Vancouver

Hotels in Vancouver
Skyscrapers in Vancouver
Hyatt Hotels and Resorts
Hotel buildings completed in 1973
Skyscraper hotels in Canada
1973 establishments in British Columbia